Marin Beçikemi (c. 1468 – 1526) was an Albanian scholar and orator who was a prominent humanist in the cities of Brescia and later Padua in the Republic of Venice in the early 16th century. He maintained a humanist school and was a professor in the University of Padua. He mostly wrote commentaries about classical Latin literature and was well known for his orations in the region of Venice.

Early life
Beçikemi came from an Albanian family in Scutari (Shkodër), then part of the Venetian possessions in Albania. He was probably born in 1468. Many of the biographical details about his family come from several orations and letters he wrote including a panegyric which he wrote in 1503 and directed to the Venetian senate as a laudation for the resettlement of 2,000 Albanian refugees from Shkodra in Italy after the fall of the city to the Ottomans. His grandfather Pietro was, together with Stefano Ionina, an Albanian ambassador serving in Venice. His grandfather and his brother's grandfather had died in the defense of Drisht against Stefan Balšić (1429) His father, Marino, was a secretary of the Republic of Venice at the Ottoman court for about thirty years. The only information about his mother comes from Apostolo Zeno who writes that she was Bianca Pagnano, daughter of Guglielmo Pagnano who hailed from a Milanese merchant family active in Venetian Dalmatia. Beçikemi's father, his brothers,  his uncle Stefan and many other relatives fought in the siege of Shkodra in 1478–79. In 1477, he had been sent to nearby Dulcigno just before the beginning of the siege. In total, 26 members out of 30 of his family died in the siege of Shkodra – including his father. Beçikemi, who was eleven at the time, was sent to Brescia to study. The events of the siege of Shkodra were of great significance to Beçikemi who often recalled them and referred to his community even many years after they had settled in Italy as noi miseri profughi albanesi ("we, the miserable Albanian refugees") and called himself infelice profugo (an unhappy refugee).

Career 
In Brescia, Beçikemi studied Latin and ancient Greek. In 1484, at only 17 years of age, he held a speech in the city in honour of mayor Marco Antonio Morosini. At that time, he returned to Dulcigno where he married Caterina, the daughter of the local nobleman Pasquale Dabri whose mother belonged to the Bruti family. From this point onwards began Beçikemi academic career. Between 1492 and 1496 he taught at the grammar school of the Republic of Ragusa. His commentary on classical Latin authors Castigationes et observationes in Virgilium , Ovidium , Ciceronem , Servium et Priscianum was published during this time, in 1495, and was dedicated to the Ragusan Senate. In Ragusa he befriended humanist and poet Ivan Gučetić (1451–1502). He was since October 1496 the secretary of Venetian patrician Melchiorre Trevisan, when the latter was provvedittore of the Venetian fleet based in the lands of Ferdinand II of Naples, and later provvedittore generale in the areas which passed from the Duchy of Milan to Venice in 1499. In Brescia he tutored the son of Girolamo Donato (1495–1497).

In 1500, he received Venetian citizenship and opened his personal humanist school. In 1501, he lectured in the university of Brescia and in 1503 he became chairman of the city's municipal school. In Brescia, his first works in Latin were published, such as Observationum collectanea in primum Historiae naturali librum (1504–1506). In 1503 he published a panegyric to the Venetian Senate concerning the relief of the refugees after the siege of Shkodra. He wrote commentaries on Cicero, Pliny the Elder and other classical philosophers. At the University of Padua he taught rhetoric.

In 1962 his panegyric of 1503 was translated into Albanian and English and included with Marin Barleti's work, The Siege of Shkodra.

Published works
Castigationes ad Apuleium Victorinum et Ciceronis opus de Oratore etc. necnon praeceptiones de componenda epistola, funebrique et nuptiali oratione (1495)
Praelectio in C Plinium … (1503)
Panegyricus serenissimo principi Leonardo Lauretano (1504)
Variarum observationum Collectanea (27 August 1504)
Observationum collectanea in primum Historiae naturali librum (1504–1506)

Notes

References

Bibliography

External links 

People from Shkodër
1468 births
1526 deaths
Scholars of ancient Roman philosophy
Rhetoricians
Venetian Renaissance humanists
Academic staff of the University of Padua
16th-century Latin-language writers
15th-century Latin writers
Albanian humanists